The mountain sucker (Catostomus platyrhynchus) is a sucker found throughout western North America, on both sides of the Rocky Mountains, including the upper Missouri River, Columbia River, Sacramento River, and Colorado River. It is a slender, streamlined fish typically under  in length. It is generally olive green or brown above, with pale underparts, and breeding males have a lateral red-orange band and fins suffused with the same color. It is mainly herbivorous, feeding on algae and diatoms. Breeding takes place in late spring and early summer in gravelly riffles in small streams.

Description
This is a slender and streamlined sucker, generally olive green to brown above and on the sides, and white to yellowish underneath. There may be a pattern of darker blotches along the sides. Adult males will also have a dark red-orange band over a dark green band on each side, and during breeding season their fins will take on a red-orange shade also. Although the species epithet platyrhynchus means "flat snout", the snout is not actually less round than in other suckers. The mouth is underneath, framed by large and protrusible lips covered with many papillae. The inner margin of the lower lip has two semicircular bare areas, and a cartilaginous plate used for scraping. Just above the 9-rayed pelvic fins there are small protrusions on each side. Length ranges up to 25 cm, with a length under 20 cm typical.

Distribution and habitat
The mountain sucker's range is quite extensive in the United States, but extremely limited in Canada. They are found as far north as Maine, but the mountain sucker is limited in the Maine region. In the United States, it is found on both sides of the Rocky Mountains, including the upper Missouri River, Columbia River, Sacramento River, and Colorado River.

While suckerfish in general live in a variety of habitats, the mountain sucker tends to favor clear water streams with a moderate gradient, with widths of 3 – 15 m and depths of less than 2 m, and rocky or gravelly bottoms. Although not exclusive to high elevations, they often live in cool mountain streams (thus the common name), being found as high as 2,800 m, and in waters just above freezing temperatures. Within a stream, they are found in pools or eddies behind or under rocks and logs.

Ecology
Mountain suckers are primarily herbivorous, feeding mostly on algae and diatoms, but they will eat various aquatic invertebrates as well. They feed by scraping the substrate with their mouths.

Spawning occurs during late spring to early summer, when the waters are between 10.5-18.8°C. They move into smaller streams, where they spawn over gravel riffles upstream from quiet pools.

References 

 http://www.livinglandscapes.bc.ca/cbasin/peter_myles/nat_catostomidae.html
 
 Peter B. Moyle, Inland Fishes of California (University of California Press, 2002), pp. 180–182
 

Catostomus
Fish of North America
Fish described in 1874